Abidjan Department is a department of Ivory Coast. It is the sole department in Abidjan Autonomous District: the territory of the department and the district are the same.

History

Abidjan Department was created in 1969 as one of the 24 new departments that were created to take the place of the six departments that were being abolished. It was created from territory that was formerly part of Sud Department. Using current boundaries as a reference, from 1969 to 1988 the department encompassed all of the Abidjan Autonomous District; all of Grands-Ponts Region; all of Agnéby-Tiassa Region, with the exception of Agboville Department; and Alépé Department in La Mé Region.

Abidjan Department was divided into three parts in 1988 in order to create Grand-Lahou Department and Tiassalé Department.

In 1997, regions were introduced as new first-level subdivisions of Ivory Coast; as a result, all departments were converted into second-level subdivisions. Abidjan Department was included as part of Lagunes Region. Abidjan Department was divided again in 1998 in order to create Alépé, Dabou, and Jacqueville Departments.

In 2011, districts were introduced as new first-level subdivisions of Ivory Coast. At the same time, regions were reorganised and became second-level subdivisions and all departments were converted into third-level subdivisions. At this time, Abidjan Department became part of Abidjan Autonomous District, one of two districts in the country with no regions. Abidjan Department and the Abidjan Autonomous District share the same territory.

Notes

1969 establishments in Ivory Coast
States and territories established in 1969
Departments of Abidjan